Hugh Weathers is an American farmer and politician from South Carolina. He serves as South Carolina's Commissioner of Agriculture. He has held the position since September 14, 2004. Weathers is a member of the Republican Party.

Early life and career
Weathers is from Bowman, South Carolina, where he grew up on Weathers Farms, a  dairy farm. He graduated from Bowman Academy as its valedictorian. He earned his bachelor's degree in accounting and finance from the University of South Carolina in 1980, and was a member of Phi Beta Kappa.

Weathers joined the family dairy business in 1980. He and his brother, Landry, inherited the farm.

Commissioner of Agriculture
Weathers was appointed by Governor Mark Sanford on September 14, 2004, to be the commissioner of agriculture after the incumbent commissioner, Charles Sharpe had been accused of illegal cockfighting, lying to investigators, extortion, and money laundering. Weathers served as interim commissioner until January 2007 following his election in 2006.

As commissioner of agriculture, Weathers sough to expand consumers access and reliance on local produce. In 2006, Weathers oversaw the creation of the branding "Certified SC Grown" to highlight produce grown in South Carolina. Weathers also advocated to increase the economic impact of the department to $50 billion by 2020.

Weathers won reelection in the 2022 general election with 77.6% of the vote, defeating Green Party candidate David Edmond. Weathers indicated that this will be his final term in office.

Personal life
Weathers is married with three children and is a fourth-generation farmer. Weathers is a singer; he has performed at many public events, including the governor's Carolighting at the South Carolina Statehouse on November 20, 2022.

Notes

References

1956 births
Living people
People from Orangeburg, South Carolina
University of South Carolina alumni
South Carolina Republicans
Dairy farmers